
Mińsk County is a unit of territorial administration and local government (powiat) in Masovian Voivodeship, east-central Poland. It was (re)created on January 1, 1999, as a result of the Polish local government reforms passed in 1998.

As of 2019 its total population is 150,480, out of which the population of Mińsk Mazowiecki is 40,836, that of Sulejówek is 19,766, that of Halinów is 3,739, that of Kałuszyn is 2,899, and the rural population is 82,638.

Neighbouring counties
Mińsk County is bordered by Węgrów County to the north-east, Siedlce County to the east, Garwolin County to the south, Otwock County and the city of Warsaw to the west, and Wołomin County to the north-west.

Administrative division
The county is subdivided into 13 gminas (two urban, two urban-rural and nine rural). These are listed in the following table, in descending order of population.

References

 
Land counties of Masovian Voivodeship